This is a list of airports in Illinois (a U.S. state), grouped by type and sorted by location. It contains all public-use and military airports in the state. Some private-use and former airports may be included where notable, such as airports that were previously public-use, those with commercial enplanements recorded by the FAA or airports assigned an IATA airport code.

(1) Please do not move or remove the onlyinclude tags; they are used to transclude this state's "Commercial Service – Primary" airports in the List of airports in the United States. Also please do not add columns to the table since all the U.S. state lists are using the same format so that they can be transcluded into a single sortable table.

(2) To compare airport use, enplanement (passenger boarding) figures are taken from a single source and are for the same year. This list currently contains the 2019 FAA enplanement data, as published in October 2020. Please do not change the enplanements for individual airports based on data from other sources. If you wish to add such information, please place it in the airport's article, not on this list.

(3) Airport names shown in bold indicate the airport has scheduled passenger service on commercial airlines. If you change an airport name to bold, please be sure to also add an ==Airlines and destinations== section to the corresponding airport article.

See also 
 Essential Air Service
 Illinois World War II Army Airfields
 Wikipedia:WikiProject Aviation/Airline destination lists: North America#Illinois

References 
Federal Aviation Administration (FAA):
 FAA Airport Data (Form 5010) from National Flight Data Center (NFDC), also available from AirportIQ 5010
 National Plan of Integrated Airport Systems (2017–2021), released 30 September 2016
 Passenger Boarding (Enplanement) Data for CY 2019 and 2020, updated November 8, 2021

Illinois Department of Transportation (IDOT):
 Division of Aeronautics

Other sites used as a reference when compiling and updating this list:
 Aviation Safety Network – used to check IATA airport codes
 Great Circle Mapper: Airports in Illinois – used to check IATA and ICAO airport codes
 Abandoned & Little-Known Airfields: Illinois – used for information on former airports

 
Airports
Illinois
Airports